The second edition of the Caribbean Series (Serie del Caribe) was held from February 21 through February 27, in 1950. It featured the champion baseball teams of Cuba, Alacranes del Almendares; Panama, Carta Vieja Yankees; Puerto Rico, Criollos de Caguas, and Venezuela, Navegantes del Magallanes. The format consisted of 12 games, each team facing the other teams twice, and the games were played at Sixto Escobar Stadium in San Juan, Puerto Rico.

Summary
The Series had to go more than the scheduled 12 games when both Panama and Puerto Rico teams ended with a similar 4-2 record. Panama clinched the title after beating Puerto Rico in a tiebreaker game. The Panamanian team, who entered the series as underdog, was led by manager/outfielder  Wayne Blackburn, pitcher Chet Brewer (2-0), and third baseman Joe Tuminelli, who hit two home runs with seven runs batted in as he received Series MVP honors. The champion team also counted with pitchers John Fitzgerald, Tony Jacobs, Jean-Pierre Roy and Pat Scantlebury; catchers Roy Easterwood and Stan Andrews; second baseman Spook Jacobs, and outfielder Ted Cieslak.

Puerto Rico was led by manager/outfielder Luis Rodríguez Olmo, who hit .292, and pitcher Luis Arroyo (2-0), who posted a 1.72 ERA and allowed eight hits in 15⅔ innings. Other significant players in the roster included outfielder Willard Brown (.348), pitchers Wilmer Fields (1-0, one HR) and Rubén Gómez, and first baseman Vic Power.

Even with the Cubans heavily favored to win the Series, they only went 3-3. The team was managed by catcher Fermín Guerra, and included Andrés Fleitas, Al Gionfriddo, Conrado Marrero, Willy Miranda, René Monteagudo and Roberto Ortiz. Slugger Héctor Rodríguez led the hitters with a .474 batting average (9-for-19), while pitcher Bob Hooper ended 2-0.

The hapless Venezuelan team was managed by outfielder Vidal López and finished with a 1-5 record, being outscored 14-22, while losing by one run in three of their five defeats. López paced the offense with a team-high four RBIs, leading also the Series in doubles (4) and tying Guerra and Monteagudo for 4th in RBIs. The roster included Alex Carrasquel, Chico Carrasquel, Pete Coscarart, Terris McDuffie, Bob Griffith, Jim Pendleton and Chucho Ramos, while the team's only victory came behind a strong pitching effort from starter Santiago Ullrich in the opener.

Participating teams

Final standings

Scoreboards

Game 1, February 21

Game 2, February 21

Game 3, February 22

Game 4, February 22

Game 5, February 23

Game 6, February 23

Game 7, February 24

Game 8, February 24

Game 9, February 25

Game 10, February 25

Game 11, February 26

Game 12, February 26

Tiebreaker Game, February 27

Statistics leaders

Awards

See also
List of baseball players who have played in the Caribbean Series

References

Sources
Antero Núñez, José. Series del Caribe. Jefferson, Caracas, Venezuela: Impresos Urbina, C.A., 1987.
Gutiérrez, Daniel. Enciclopedia del Béisbol en Venezuela – 1895-2006 . Caracas, Venezuela: Impresión Arte, C.A., 2007.

External links
Official site
Latino Baseball
Series del Caribe, Las (Spanish)
  
  

Caribbean
Caribbean Series
International baseball competitions hosted by Puerto Rico
Sports in San Juan, Puerto Rico
1950 in Caribbean sport
1950 in Puerto Rican sports
Caribbean Series